FAM71E1, also known as Family With Sequence Similarity 71 Member E1, is a protein that in humans is encoded by the FAM71E1 gene. It is thought to be ubiquitously expressed at low levels throughout the body, and it is conserved in vertebrates, particularly mammals and some reptiles. The protein is localized to the nucleus and can be exported to the cytoplasm.

Gene

Location 
The gene is located on the minus strand at 19q13.33 and spans from 50,466,643 to 50,476,753. It is 10,070 bp long.

Gene Neighbohood 
In humans, the gene is flanked by the following genes:

 SPIB: putative oncogene that is active in hematopoietic cells  
 MYBPC2: encodes a structural protein and is actively expressed in striated muscle cells 
 EMC10: encodes a protein of unknown function 
 JOSD2: encodes a protein involved in de-ubiquitination

Promoter 
The promoter of FAM71E1 is located on the minus strand from 50,476,094 to 50,477,946 . It is 1,853 bp long.

Expression 
The gene seems to be ubiquitously expressed at low levels throughout the body  but has prominent expression in the adult human testis, followed by lower expression levels in the sperm, oocyte, and brain. Age does not have an effect on its expression in the skeletal muscle of males or females. Its expression is elevated prior to the differentiation of embryonic stem cells into pancreatic islet-like cells.

Transcript

Isoforms 
The FAM71E1 gene produces two isoforms from alternative splicing.  Isoform 1 is 1281 bp long, and isoform 2 is slightly shorter at 1233 bp long. Both transcript variants have 5 exons, 4 of which are coding exons. The third intron for the isoform 2 transcript is longer than the one found in isoform 1.

Regulation 
The FAM71E1 transcript is regulated by micro-RNAs, such as miR-149, miR-7, miR-125b, miR-125a-5p, miR192-5p, and miR-215.

Protein

Properties 
The protein from isoform 1 is 247 amino acids long with a molecular weight of 27.6 kDa. It has a charge of 5.0 and an isoelectric point of 8.9. It has a domain of unknown function (DUF3699), which is conserved in eukaryotes and has no known pairwise interactions with other domains. The structure of the protein has 3 alpha helices and 5 beta strands.

Localization 
The protein is predicted to localize to the nucleus and thought to be mainly associated with the nucleoli fibrillar center. It can also be exported to the cytoplasm.

Homologs

Paralogs 
The FAM71E1 gene is fast evolving. It has the following 8 paralogs: FAM71A, FAM71B, FAM71C, FAM71D, FAM71E2, FAM71F1, FAM71F2, and AC020922.1. FAM71D, FAM71E2 and AC0209221.1 are found in Amniotes and their last common ancestor with FAM71E1 was likely in the ancestor of the Sauria taxon, which includes reptiles and birds. The remaining paralogs are found in mammals and are expressed in organisms from the evolutionary descendants of the lobe-finned fish (Sarcopterygii). Their last common ancestor with FAM71E1 was Coelacanth (Latimeria chalumnae).

Orthologs 
Orthologs of FAM71E1 can be found only in vertebrates, primarily in placental mammals in the Boreoeutheria group and occasionally in a few reptilian species. Reptiles and marsupials are included in the distant homologs, while orthologs in placental animals such as rodents and primates are more closely related to FAM71E1. The gene history contains 27 duplication events and 1 splitting event.

Clinical Significance

Mutations 
There are no disease-causing mutations associated with this gene, and it is tolerant towards loss-of-function variants.

Disease Associations 
FAM71E1 has reduced expression in Type 2 diabetes patients and is likely not involved in the disease's pathophysiology. Its expression is also altered in Parkinson's disease and several cancers, such as non-triple negative ductal carcinoma in situ, breast cancer, pancreatic adenocarcinoma, and colorectal carcinoma. It is a gene of interest in predicting susceptibility to pneumonia.

References